Bosnian Girl is a discriminator art work by a visual artist Šejla Kamerić that started in 2003 as a public project consisting of postcards, posters, billboards, that is exhibited either as an intervention into public space or as a black and white photograph in various dimensions. It was done in collaboration with photographer Tarik Samarah.

Description and analysis 
Denigrating phrases about Bosnian women are superimposed over a black and white photograph of the artist staring straight at the viewer. Taken from graffiti written by an unknown Dutch soldier in 1994–1995, a member of the Royal Netherlands Army who, as part of the UN Protection Force (UNPROFOR) in Bosnia and Herzegovina 1992-95, were responsible for protecting the Srebrenica safe area. The artist’s gaze is unflinching, direct and challenges not just the words pushed onto her, and all Bosnian women, but invites us to see their new form of identity – where victimhood and prejudice, the past and the future are intertwined in co-existing opposition.

Originally a series of posters publicly displayed on the 2003 anniversary of the Srebenica genocide, this work has become iconic of post-war Bosnia and Herzegovina, a direct confrontation of war crimes committed against women and the prejudices that came during and after it.  Part of the multiple permanent exhibitions and museum collections, Bosnian Girl is also on view as part of the permanent exhibition in the Memorial Centre Potočari, Srebrenica, Bosnia and Herzegovina.

Selected exhibitions 

 2003  The Gorges of the Balkans, curated by Rene Block, 30.08. – 23.11.2003, Kunsthalle Fridericianum, Kassel, Germany. 
 2003  Balkan Konzulat: Sarajevo, curated by Lejla Hodžić, October – November 2003, Rotor Gallery, Graz, Austria. 
 2004  Others and Dreams, solo show, 18.09.–24.10.2004, Portikus Frankfurt am Main, Germany. 
 2005  Another Expo – Beyond the Nation-States, curated by Shinya Watanabe, June 2005, Gallery Level1, Kitakyushu, Japan. 
 2005  Another Expo – Beyond the Nation-States, curated by Shinya Watanabe, September 2005, Gallery White Box, New York, USA.
 2007  L‘enfer, C‘est les Autres / ‘Hell is… other people’, 22.07. – 09.09.2007, curated by Nathalie Zonnenberg, Stedelijk Museum Bureau Amsterdam, the Netherlands.
 2008  Šejla Kamerić, 22.11.2008 – 25.01.2009, Galerie im Taxispalais, Innsbruck, Austria. 
 2008  Cutting Realities: Gender Strategies in Art, curated by Walter Seidl, 23.09.-29.11.2008, Austrian Cultural Forum, New York, USA.
 2009  Gender Check – Femininity and Masculinity in the Art of Eastern Europe, curated by Bojana Pejić, 13.11.2009 – 14.11.2010, Museum of Modern Art (MUMOK), Vienna, Austria.
 2009  Windows upon Oceans – 8. Baltic Biennial of Contemporary Art, Muzeum Narodowe w Szczecinie, Szczecin, Poland. 
 2010  A Pair of Left Shoes, curated by Tihomir Milovac, 16.04. –27.05.2010, Museum of Contemporary Art Zagreb, Croatia. 
 2010  No More Drama, Röda Sten Centre for Contemporary Art and Culture, Göteborg, Sweden.
 2011 1395 Days without Red, Museum of contemporary art Belgrade, Serbia. 
 2012  9th Gwangju Biennale: Round Table, Artistic Co-directors: Sunjung Kim, Mami Kataoka, Carol Yinghua Lu, Nancy Adajania, Wassan AI-Khudhairi, Alia Swastika, 7 September – 11 November 2012, Various venues, Gwangju, South Korea.
 2012  Šejla Kamerić – 1395 Days without Red, 30.11.2012 – 20.01.2013, CAC Contemporary Art Centre, Vilnius, Lithuania. 
 2013  Public Diary, 5th Yebisu International Festival for Art and Alternative Visions, curated by Keiko Okamura, 08. – 28.02. 2013, Tokyo Metropolitan Museum of Photography, Tokyo, Japan.
 2014  Memory Lane – Contemporary Art Scene from Bosnia and Herzegovina, curated by Pierre Courtin, 07.06. – 26.07. 2014, Galerie du Jour-agnés b., Paris, France. 
 2015  Remember Lidice, curated by Rene Block, 12.09.2015 – 13.02.2016, Edition Block, Berlin, Germany. 
 2015  Autonomy of Self. Rejecting violence with the lens in former Ottoman territories, curated by Joy Stacy, 11.09. – 31.10.2015, P21 Gallery, London, UK.
 2015  30 Years After, curated by Erzen Shkololli, 04.05. – 04.06.2015, National Gallery of Kosovo, Prishtina, Kosovo. 
 2015  When the Heart Goes Bing Bam Boom, curated by, curated by Başak Doğa Temür, 11.12. 2015 – 28.02.2016, Arter – Space for Art, Vehbi Koç Foundation, Istanbul
 2018  I Really Really Really Really Really, curated by Peter Tomaž Dobrila, 09.11. – 01.12.2018, ACE Kibla, Maribor.

Collections 

 TATE Modern Collection, London
 Kontakt. The Art Collection of Erste Group and ERSTE Foundation, Vienna
 Art Collection Telekom, Bonn
 Vehbi Koç Foundation Contemporary Art Collection (2007+), Istanbul
 Haubrok Collection, Fahrbereitschaft, Berlin
 Memorial Center Potočari, Srebrenica

Selected bibliography 

 TOMAŠOVIĆ, Joško. "Šejla Kamerić" in: Andre/Others, Sørlandets Kunstmuseum, 2005, pp. 42-45.
 HODŽIĆ, Lejla. "Balkan Konsulat. Sarajevo", in: Balkan Konsulat (ed. Makovec, Margarethe and Lederer, Anton), <rotor> and Revolver, Graz-Frankfurt am Main 2006, pp. 96-111.
 BLAŽEVIĆ, Dunja. "Šejla Kamerić", in: Vodič kroz izložbu Kontakt Beograd …dela iz kolekcije Erste Bank Grupe, Muzej savremene umetnosti Beograd (20.01.-1.03.2007), (ed. Seidl, Walter and Stellwag-Carion, Cornelia), Kontakt. Umetnička kolekcija Erste Bank Grupe, 2007.
 BLOCK, Rene and BABIS, Marius (ed.). Die Balkan-Trilogie/The Balkan Trilogy, Kunsthalle Fridericianum, Kassel 2007.
 HELMS, Elissa. “East and West Kiss. Gender, Orientalism, and Balkanism in Muslim-Majority Bosnia-Herzegovina”, in: Slavic Review, vol. 67, no. 1., 2008, pp. 88-119
 HUGHS, Jeffrey and TURKOVIC, Dana (ed.). Odavde (from here), Otuda (from there), Webster University, St. Louis 2008
 MEREWETHER, Charles. "Unerledigte Angelegenheiten: Dream House and Bosnian Girl/Unifinshed Business: Dream House and Bosnian Girl" in: Portikus 2004-2007. Book of a Sleeping Village, Frankfurt am Main – Cologne 2008, pp. 109-119.
 SEIDL, Walter (ed.). Cutting Realities. Gender Strategies in Art. Works from Kontakt. The Art Collection of Erste Bank Group, Vienna 2008.
 ĐORĐEVIĆ, Tamara. “Postkolonijalne studije i Balkanizam: Bosnian Girl”, 2009
 NEUMAYR, Agnes. “Šejla Kamerić: Die Kunst vermag est, Vorurteile Aufzubrechen un das Bewusstsein der Menschen zu verandern”, in: Politik der Gefühle: Susanne K. Langer und Hannah Arendt, Innsbruck University Press, Innsburck 2009, pp. 354-369.
 PEJIĆ, Bojana (ed.). Gender Check: Femininity and Masculinity in the Art of Eastern Europe, Moderne Kunst Stiftung Ludiwg Wien, Vienna 2009
 MUKA, Edi. Šejla Kamerić, (ed.) Meral Agish, Galerie Tanja Wagner, Berlin 2011
 GRŽINIĆ, Marina. “Europe: Gender, Class, Race.”, in: The Scholar & Feminist Online, 10. 3. 2012
 HELMS, Elissa. “Bosnian Girl’: Nationalism and Innocence through Images of Women”, in: Retracting Images: Visual Culture After Yugoslavia (ed. Šuber, Danilo and Karamanić, Slobodan), 2012, pp. 193 – 222
 HOŠIĆ, Irfan. Iz/van konteksta. Ogledi i kritike iz umjetnosti, arhitekture i mode, Connectum Sarajevo, 2013
 HOYOS, Nathalie and SCHUMAHER Rainald (ed.). "Fragile Sense of Hope", Berlin 2014. 
 BALIÇ, İlkay (ed.). Šejla Kamerić. When The Heart Goes Bing Bam Boom, ARTER, Istanbul 2015
 BLACKWOOD, Jonathan. Introduction to Contemporary Art in BiH, 2010. 
 ĐELILOVIĆ, Asim. Muzej u Egzilu. Bosna i Hercegovina u modernom dobu (drugo dopunjeno izdajanje), Sarajevo 2015.
 MUKA, Edi (text). Šejla Kamerić. 30 Year After, National Gallery of Kosovo, Prishtina 2015.
 BUDEN, Boris. "Šejla Kamerić, Bosnian Girl, 2003", in: Kontakt (ed. Eiblmyr, Silvia, Ševčik, Jiří, Schöllhammer, Georg, Stipančić, Branka And Szymczyk, Adam), Vienna 2017, pp. 215-217.
 GOSLING, Lucinda, ROBINSON Hilary, TOBIN Amy (ed.). The Art of Feminism: Images that Shaped the Fight for Equality, 1857–2017, Chronicle Books LLC, San Francisco, 2018. 
 ČVORO, Uroš. Transitional Aesthetics: Contemporary Art at the Edge of Europe, Bloomsbury Academic, 2018

References 

2013 works
Works about Bosnia and Herzegovina
Works about women